Austria participated at the 2018 Summer Youth Olympics in Buenos Aires, Argentina from 6 October to 18 October 2018.

Medalists 

Medals awarded to participants of mixed-NOC (combined) teams are represented in italics. These medals are not counted towards the individual NOC medal tally.

Athletics

Cycling

Austria qualified a girls' combined team based on its ranking in the Youth Olympic Games Junior Nation Rankings.

 Girls' combined team - 1 team of 2 athletes

Dancesport

Austria qualified one dancer based on its performance at the 2018 World Youth Breaking Championship.

 B-Girls - Ella

Fencing

Austria qualified one athlete based on its performance at the 2018 Cadet World Championship.

 Boys' Epée - Alexander Biro

Field hockey

Boys' Tournament 

 Preliminary round

 Quarterfinals

 5–8th place semifinals

Girls' Tournament 

 Preliminary round

 Quarterfinals

 5–8th place semifinals

Golf

Individual

Team

Gymnastics

Trampoline
Austria qualified one gymnast based on its performance at the 2018 European Junior Championship.

 Boys' trampoline - 1 quota

Judo

Team

Sailing

Austria qualified one boat based on its performance at the 2018 Nacra 15 World Championships.

 Mixed Nacra 15 - 1 boat

Shooting

Individual

Team

Sport climbing

Austria qualified two sport climbers based on its performance at the 2017 World Youth Sport Climbing Championships. They also qualified another climber based on its performance at the 2017 European Youth Sport Climbing Championships.

 Boys' combined - 1 quota (Nikolai Uznik)
 Girls' combined - 2 quotas (Sandra Lettner, Laura Lammer)

Swimming

Table tennis

References

2018 in Austrian sport
Nations at the 2018 Summer Youth Olympics
Austria at the Youth Olympics